Major Changes is a 1987 album by Frank Morgan with the McCoy Tyner Trio released on the Contemporary label. It was recorded in April 1987 and features performances by Morgan and Tyner with Avery Sharpe and Louis Hayes.

Reception
The Allmusic review by Scott Yanow states "Morgan's lyricism works quite well with Tyner's powerful chords, and the results are consistently memorable".

Track listing 
 "Changes" - 5:10  
 "How Deep Is the Ocean?" (Irving Berlin) - 8:17  
 "Emily" (Johnny Mandel, Johnny Mercer) - 4:21  
 "Search for Peace" - 6:59  
 "Frank's Back" - 6:09  
 "All the Things You Are" (Oscar Hammerstein II, Jerome Kern) - 5:45  
 "(Where Do I Begin?) Love Story" (Francis Lai, Carl Sigman) - 10:43  
 "So What" (Miles Davis) - 9:40  
All compositions by McCoy Tyner except as indicated
 Recorded in NYC, April 27, 28 & 29, 1987

Personnel 
 McCoy Tyner - piano
 Frank Morgan - alto saxophone
 Avery Sharpe - bass
 Louis Hayes - drums
Technical
Ed Rak - recording engineer
Jim Marshall - front cover photography

References 

Frank Morgan (musician) albums
McCoy Tyner albums
1987 albums
Contemporary Records albums